Mel Hopkins (7 November 1934 – 18 October 2010) was a Wales international footballer. He played at left back.

Club career

The son of a miner, he was signed by Tottenham Hotspur at the age of 15, when spotted playing for his local boy's club. He was taken on as an apprentice after just one trial. Mel Hopkins made his debut in January 1952 and winning a League and FA Cup double in 1961. In 1959, he suffered a serious injury following a collision with Ian St John, smashing his nose and upper jaw, an injury which would keep him out of football for two years.

In total, Hopkins played 219 games for Spurs, before leaving Spurs for Brighton and Hove Albion in October 1964 for a transfer fee of £8,000. He scored 2 goals and played 58 games for Albion. A brief spell at Ballymena United in Northern Ireland 1967 was followed by a move to Bradford Park Avenue in January 1969, where he played 30 games, retiring in 1970.

International career

Hopkins played for his country between 1956 and 1963, earning 34 caps including playing for the Wales squad for the 1958 FIFA World Cup in Sweden, where they lost narrowly to Brazil in the quarter-finals.

In 2003, Hopkins was given a merit award by the Football Association of Wales.

References

Further reading

Ashley Drake Publishing - When Pele Broke Our Hearts

1934 births
2010 deaths
People from Ystrad
Sportspeople from Rhondda Cynon Taf
English Football League players
Tottenham Hotspur F.C. players
Brighton & Hove Albion F.C. players
Canterbury City F.C. players
Bradford (Park Avenue) A.F.C. players
Welsh footballers
Wales under-23 international footballers
Wales international footballers
1958 FIFA World Cup players
Association football fullbacks